Harib Abdullah Harib Al-Habsi (born 4 December 1986), commonly known as Harib Al-Habsi, is an Omani footballer who plays as a goalkeeper for Al-Mudhaibi SC in the Oman First Division League.

Club career statistics

Personal life
Harib is the younger brother of Oman national football team and Wigan Athletic FC goalkeeper, Ali Al-Habsi.

International career
He was selected for the national team for the first time in 2012. He made his first appearance for Oman on 28 September 2012 in a friendly match against Yemen when he came on as a substitute for Mazin Al-Kasbi at the beginning of the second half.

Honours

Club
With Saham
Omani Super Cup (1): 2010
With Fanja
Oman Elite League (0): 2012-13

References

External links
 
 Harib Al-Habsi at Goal.com 
 
 

1986 births
Living people
People from Al-Mudhaibi
Omani footballers
Oman international footballers
Association football goalkeepers
Muscat Club players
Saham SC players
Sur SC players
Fanja SC players
Footballers at the 2006 Asian Games
Asian Games competitors for Oman